The Mills Ministry was the ministry of the ninth Chief Minister of the Northern Territory, Terry Mills. It came into operation on 4 September, following the election of the Mills Country Liberal government in the 2012 election. Terry Mills and Robyn Lambley were sworn in as Chief Minister and Deputy Chief Minister respectively on 29 August 2012.

A reshuffle took place on 6 March 2013 following the resignation of Robyn Lambley as Deputy Chief Minister and Treasurer, and the expulsion from cabinet of Dave Tollner after a heated disagreement with Mills.

On 12 March 2013, Mills was replaced as Chief Minister by Adam Giles.

Interim ministry (29 August 2012 – 3 September 2012)

First ministry (4 September 2012 – 1 October 2012)

Second ministry (2 October 2012 – 13 December 2012)

Third ministry (14 December 2012 – 6 March 2013)

Fourth ministry (6 March 2013 – 12 March 2013)

References

External links
The Chief Minister and the Cabinet

Mills 1